Cedarville School District 44 is a school district in Crawford County, Arkansas.

References

External links
 

School districts in Arkansas